Cita En Las Nubes is the debut album by Argentine-Mexican singer Noel Schajris released in 1999.

Track listing

 Iluminame
 Pobre Corazón
 Te Espero
 Para Siempre
 Donde Nace El Amor
 ¿A Donde Van Las Nubes?
 Te Seguiré
 Cada Vez
 Siempre Que Tú Estés
 Volverá El Amor
 Iluminame (Remix Version)
 Iluminame (English Version)

1999 debut albums
Noel Schajris albums